Ensign is a surname. Notable people with the surname include:

John Ensign (born 1958), American politician
Michael Ensign (born 1944), American actor
Sean Ensign (born 1972), American singer-songwriter
Tod Ensign (died 2014), American lawyer
William L. Ensign (1928–2010), American architect